The Gruta Brisa Azul (Blue Breeze Cave), sometimes Gruta Bela Azul (Beautiful Blue Cave), is a geological feature situated in the civil parish of Feteira, in the municipality of Angra do Heroísmo, in the Portuguese archipelago of the Azores.

Formed by maritime erosion, the cave is situated at sea level on the northern face of the small Cabras Islet. Access to the cave is only made by water.

References

Angra do Heroísmo
Gruta Brisa Azul
Lava tubes